Walt Whitman Middle School may refer to:
 Walt Whitman Middle School of Fairfax County Public Schools
 Whitman Middle School of Seattle Public Schools
 M.S. 246 Walt Whitman of New York City Public Schools